Minna Hesso (born 15 March 1976) is a Finnish snowboarder. 

She was born in Vantaa. She competed at the 1998 Winter Olympics, in halfpipe, and also at the  2002 Winter Olympics. 

Hesso moved to Verbier, Switzerland, in her early twenties.

References

External links 
 

1976 births
Living people
Sportspeople from Vantaa
Finnish female snowboarders
Olympic snowboarders of Finland
Snowboarders at the 1998 Winter Olympics
Snowboarders at the 2002 Winter Olympics
Finnish expatriate sportspeople in Switzerland